Giovanni Strangio (born January 3, 1979) is a member of the 'Ndrangheta born in Siderno, Calabria. Starting from 2007, he was included on the list of most wanted fugitives in Italy as well as in Germany, Strangio was arrested in Amsterdam on March 12, 2009.

San Luca feud
Strangio was wanted for the Duisburg massacre on August 15, 2007, which made headlines worldwide. He was one of two gunmen that killed six men in front of the Da Bruno restaurant near the main railway station. More than 70 shots were fired. The carnage was part of a long-standing feud between two 'Ndrangheta clans from San Luca in Calabria, the Pelle-Vottari-Romeo and Strangio-Nirta clan.

The killing revived the lingering San Luca feud that started in 1991. Strangio was arrested at the funeral of Maria Strangio where he appeared with a gun, presumably to kill members of the Pelle-Romeo clan. He was apprehended after a short exchange of fire in which he was slightly wounded. He was arrested and released in July 2007.

Duisburg massacre
Strangio returned to Germany, where he ran "Tonis Pizza" in Kaarst in North Rhine-Westphalia. From his adopted hometown, Strangio allegedly prepared the attack against the rival clan that included Marco Marmo (1982–2007), among its members, and the chief suspect in the murder of Maria Strangio, who was killed in the bloodbath. Strangio quickly became a suspect. His apartment in Kaarst was searched and it appeared that he had left it in a hurry, leaving a large amount of money behind.

On December 18, 2007, four suspects in the Duisburg massacre were arrested, but Giovanni Strangio remained a fugitive until his arrest in March 2009. The second gunman is believed to be Strangio’s brother-in-law Giuseppe Nirta, also wanted for international cocaine trafficking, who was arrested on May 23, 2008.

Strangio is not to be confused with his namesake Giovanni Strangio, the owner of the Da Bruno restaurant, who, despite his family name, in fact belongs to the rival Pelle-Vottari-Romeo clan. He was arrested on August 30, 2007, in San Luca. His brother Sebastiano Strangio was one of the victims of the massacre in Duisburg.

Arrest and trial
Strangio was arrested on March 12, 2009, in Diemen, a suburb of Amsterdam, where he was living in with his wife and son. His brother-in-law, Giuseppe Nirta, was arrested as well. He is to be extradited to Italy, not Germany, a Dutch court ruled on May 13, 2009. Italy seeks to prosecute him not only for the 2007 Duisburg killings, but also for membership of a criminal organization. Italy's reasons were more compelling than Germany's. The Duisburg killings had been the result of clashes between rival clans in the Italian town of San Luca. "Therefore the relation with Italy is bigger than the relation with Duisburg where the crime took place," according to the judge in Amsterdam. 

The trial against the clans involved in the feud started on April 14, 2010, in Locri. Strangio followed the hearing via video link to his prison cell in Rome. On July 12, 2011, the Corte d'Assise of Locri sentenced Strangio to life imprisonment for the Duisburg killings.

References

External links
 Most wanted list of the Italian ministry of the Interior: Giovanni Strangio

1979 births
Fugitives 
Fugitives wanted by Germany
Fugitives wanted on murder charges
Living people
'Ndranghetisti
'Ndranghetisti sentenced to life imprisonment
People convicted of murder by Italy
People from Siderno